Auld Lang Syne is a 1937 British historical drama film directed by James A. FitzPatrick and starring Andrew Cruickshank, Christine Adrian and Marian Spencer. It portrays the life of the eighteenth century Scottish poet Robert Burns. The film was a quota quickie, produced at Shepperton Studios for distribution by MGM. Quota costume films were rare, as the costs generally exceeded the limited budgets allowed for productions.

Cast
 Andrew Cruickshank as Robert Burns
 Christine Adrian as Jean Armour 
 Richard Ross as Gavin Hamilton 
 Marian Spencer as Clarinda 
 Malcolm Graham as Gilbert Burns 
 Doris Palette as Highland Mary 
 Jenny Laird as Alison Begbie 
 Ernest Templeton as Elder MacIntosh 
 Charles Howard as Mr. Burns 
 Anne Wilson as Agnes Burns 
 Lina Naseby as Mrs. Burns 
 Winifred Willard as Jessie 
 Kate Agnew as  Mrs. Armour 
 Frank Sutherland as Mr. Armour  
 Jock Rae as Mr. McNab  
 Vi Kaley as Mrs. McNab 
 Frank Webster as Sailor  
 Anita Graham as Mrs. Dunlap

References

Bibliography
 Chibnall, Steve. Quota Quickies: The British of the British 'B' Film. British Film Institute, 2007.
 Low, Rachael. Filmmaking in 1930s Britain. George Allen & Unwin, 1985.
 Wood, Linda. British Films, 1927-1939. British Film Institute, 1986.

External links

1937 films
British biographical drama films
British historical drama films
British black-and-white films
1930s biographical drama films
1930s historical drama films
Metro-Goldwyn-Mayer films
Films directed by James A. FitzPatrick
Films shot at Shepperton Studios
Films set in Scotland
Films set in the 18th century
Biographical films about writers
Cultural depictions of Robert Burns
1937 drama films
1930s English-language films
1930s British films